Roystonea dunlapiana, commonly known as yagua or cabiche is a species of palm which is native to Nicaragua, Honduras, and southern Mexico (Chiapas, Campeche, Quintana Roo, Tabasco, Veracruz).  It is the only species in the genus Roystonea which is absent from the insular Caribbean.

Description
Individuals have about 15 leaves with  rachises; the leaves hang well horizontal. The  inflorescences bear white male flowers with purplish anthers; the female flowers are undescribed.

Taxonomy
Roystonea is placed in the subfamily Arecoideae and the tribe Roystoneeae.  The placement Roystonea within the Arecoideae is uncertain; a phylogeny based on plastid DNA failed to resolve the position of the genus within the Arecoideae.  As of 2008, there appear to be no molecular phylogenetic studies of Roystonea and the relationship between R. dunlapiana and the rest of the genus is uncertain.

The species was first described by American botanist Paul H. Allen in 1952.  Allen's description of R. dunlapiana, together with his description of R. regia var. hondurensis (now synonymised with typical R. regia) was the first record of Roystonea species native to Central America.

Common names
The species is commonly known as yagua or cabiche in Honduras.

Distribution
Roystonea dunlapiana is native to southern Mexico, Honduras and Nicaragua.  In his monograph of the genus, Scott Zona reported that it is "likely to occur in Belize".  It grows in estuaries and coastal swamps.  It is the only species in the genus Roystonea which is absent from the insular Caribbean.

References

dunlapiana
Trees of Central America
Endangered plants
Flora of Honduras
Flora of Nicaragua
Trees of Chiapas
Trees of Campeche
Trees of Quintana Roo
Trees of Tabasco
Trees of Veracruz
Endangered biota of Mexico
Plants described in 1952